In 1173, an invasion began against the dynasties of South India by the Sinhalese king and conqueror Maha Parakramabahu. His armies first captured the Pandyan kingdom, and then advanced into Chola Nadu, attacking the Tondi and Pasi regions.

Background

In approximately 1173, the Sinhalese kingdom of Polonnaruwa, invaded the neighbouring Pandya kingdom and overthrew its leader Kulasekhara Pandyan. The Sinhalese monarch, Parakramabahu I ordered Vira Pandyan to be installed to the throne. However due to the Chola king, Rajadhiraja's increased his involvement in the war, the Chola mainland became a target of the invading forces.

Invasion of Chola kingdoms
After conquering the Pandyan kingdom, the leader of the expeditionary forces, Lankapura invaded the Chola states of Tondi and Pasi, which the Chola inscription describes as "striking fear into the hearts of its residents". He burnt up to 30 kilometers of the Chola kingdom as a punishment for the interference in the war. The captives were sent for works, such as repairing the stupas.

Chola reactions

Rajadhiraja instructed his general to kill Lankapura. Meanwhile, the fear-ridden residents, started performing for Shiva, expecting for relief from the invaders.

The worshippers carried the worship for 28 days, until they received the news Lankapura had retreated. The chief who ruled the village of Arapakkam, Edirisola Subramanam, granted the village to a Hindu priest who helped conduct worships.

References

Sources

Kingdom of Polonnaruwa
Polonnaruwa period
Overseas empires
Chola dynasty
Invasions of India